Tom Okman (Lithuanian: Tomas Okmanas; born November 5, 1987) is a Lithuanian businessman and entrepreneur. He is the co-founder of business accelerator Tesonet and cybersecurity solutions company Nord Security, which is best known for its VPN service NordVPN. In 2017, Tom Okman made the annual New Europe 100 list of the Financial Times.  In 2020, Okman was named the CEO of the year by the leading Lithuanian business newspaper Verslo Zinios.

Early life 
Tom Okman was born and raised in Vilnius. He earned a bachelor's degree in history at Vilnius University and later earned a master's degree in e-business management at Mykolas Romeris University.

Career 
Okman founded Tesonet together with Eimantas Sabaliauskas in 2008.  After trying 34 various projects and ideas, from computer games to web hosting solutions, they finally focused on network security, business hosting, and big data solutions. Both individually and through the Tesonet accelerator, Okman invested in more than 50 different projects and ventures. He is actively involved in mentoring new ventures in the Lithuanian startup ecosystem and has taken part in launching a new association aimed at the growth of active Lithuanian startups.

In 2012, Okman co-founded the VPN service company NordVPN.  He contributed to the development of the solution, significantly reducing the time required for TCP packets to travel between the client, the VPN server, and their ultimate destination.  Tom Okman is listed as one of the inventors of this method in the US patent office database.

In 2017, Okman co-founded Nord Security, an umbrella company for several cybersecurity solutions both for clients and businesses, like NordVPN, NordVPN Teams, NordPass, and NordLocker. However, a near-future vision for Nord Security, according to Okman, is to have one app that users could forget about after its activation: it would cover all the important areas of consumer security in the background.

Since 2020, Tom Okman has been a member of the Forbes Technology Council.

He is also a member of the board of trustees at the Vilnius University Institute of International Relations and Political Science, together with the eighth President of the Republic of Lithuania Dalia Grybauskaitė and other prominent Lithuanian figures.

Advocacy 
Tom Okman is a member of the board of directors of the Internet infrastructure coalition (i2Coalition). This initiative ensures that those who build the infrastructure of the internet have a voice in public policy. In 2019, i2Coalition and six leading VPN service providers launched an initiative called VPN Trust Initiative (VTI). A year later, VTI released a set of VTI Principles to offer a comprehensive set of best practices for VPN providers. Speaking on behalf of NordVPN, a member of VTI, Okman stated that the release of VTI Principles and Standards sets the bar for the whole industry.

References 

1987 births
Living people
Businesspeople in information technology
Technology company founders
Internet company founders
Businesspeople in software
21st-century Lithuanian businesspeople
Lithuanian business executives
People from Vilnius
Vilnius University alumni
Mykolas Romeris University alumni